Thomas Grimshaw may refer to:

Thomas Shuttleworth Grimshawe (1778–1850), English biographer and Anglican priest
Thomas Wrigley Grimshaw (1839–1900), Irish physician, surgeon and statistician

See also
Grimshaw (disambiguation)